Wiltrud Probst  (born 29 May 1969, in Nuremberg) is a retired tennis player from Germany.

She was ranked World No. 31 on 4 February 1991. Probst won in singles two individual titles on the WTA Tour . In 1990 she won the tournament in the New Zealand capital Wellington by a final victory over Leila Meskhi . In 1992 she won the Waregem against her compatriot Meike Babel in the final. Her most successful Grand Slam tournament she played in 1990, when she reached the knockout stages at the French Open , in which she defeated the No. 10 in the world rankings , the Spanish Conchita Martínez. Probst retired from tennis 1999.

WTA Tour finals

Singles (2–0)

Doubles (0–7)

ITF finals

Singles (0–5)

Doubles (1–4)

External links

 
 
 

1969 births
Living people
German female tennis players
Sportspeople from Nuremberg
West German female tennis players
Tennis people from Bavaria